Chandreyee Ghosh (sometimes spelled Chandreyee Ghosh or Chandrayee Ghosh) is an Indian actress, who appears in Bengali film and television series.

Career 
Ghosh made her film debut in Sekhar Das's Mohulbanir Sereng, followed by Tista in 2005, Manush Bhut and Dosar in 2006 and Kaal in 2007. In 2008/09 she announced the beginning of her directorial venture with Sama. The film, which dwells on homosexuality, as per her it is based on her own story and the music will be composed by the actor Parambrata Chatterjee. She said, "I was mentally preparing myself to step into direction for a long time," and "I now have the confidence to go ahead with this independent project."
She has also been in several television roles, such as Raat Bhor Brishti, Uttaron and Mohona. She will next be seen in a megaserial, Dushaha Bash, based on Taslima Nasreen’s work and deals with the lives of three sisters. 
She also had a successful stint with comedy in the serial Labonor Sansar, which was telecast on Zee Bangla.
She is currently active with a number of serials, among them the major ones include Behula as in Hindu Goddess Manasa, Ekhane Aakash Neel, Sindoorkhela, Kiranmala, Debipaksha, Bodhu Kon Alo Laaglo Chokhe, Ami Sirajer Begum and Jai Kali Kalkattawali all eight telecasted on Free-to-Air Channel Star Jalsa

Filmography

Television

Web series

Awards 
 2005: BFJA-Most Promising Actress Award : for Mahulbonir Sereng

References

External links

Indian film actresses
Indian television actresses
Living people
Actresses from Kolkata
Bengali actresses
Actresses in Bengali cinema
Bengal Film Journalists' Association Award winners
Bengali television actresses
21st-century Indian actresses
Year of birth missing (living people)